Yaqubabad may refer to:

Jacobabad, Sindh, Pakistan
Yaqubabad, Karachi, Karachi, Sindh, Pakistan
Yaqubabad, Alborz, Iran
Yaqubabad, Fars, Iran
Yaqubabad, Kurdistan, Iran
Yaqubabad, Hamadan, Iran
Yaqubabad, Kerman, Iran
Yaqubabad, Abyek, Qazvin Province, Iran
Yaqubabad, Buin Zahra, Qazvin Province, Iran
Yaqubabad, Razavi Khorasan, Iran